Paschimbanga Bangla Akademi is the official regulatory body of the Bengali language in West Bengal, India. It was founded on 20 May 1986 in Kolkata to act as the official authority of the language and is entrusted with the responsibility of reforming Bengali spelling and grammar, compiling dictionaries, encyclopedias and terminologies and promoting Bengali language and culture in West Bengal. Though the Akademi has no enforcement power over their rules and regulations, yet they are widely accepted by the Governments of West Bengal and Tripura as well as a considerable number of private publishing houses and institutions like the Oxford University Press and the Ramakrishna Mission.

The Akademi is housed in two separate buildings, one at Nandan-Rabindra Sadan Complex (also mentioned as Bangla Akademi-Rabindra Sadan or Nandan-Bangla Akademi Complex during the Akademi festivals and book fairs) in South Kolkata and the other at Rabindra-Okakura Bhaban, Bidhannagar (Salt Lake). Annadashankar Roy became the first President and Sanat Kumar Chattopadhyay the first secretary of the Akademi.

The Bangla Akademi has been successful in extending its activities and programs to different districts of West Bengal and even to other states in India. In Kolkata, the Bangla Akademi organises different programs in collaboration with such bodies like Bangiya Sahitya Parishad, Sahitya Akademi, Publishers and Book Sellers' Guild, Eastern Zonal Cultural Centre, National Book Trust and also with different universities and cultural organizations.

History

Bangiya Sahitya Parishad

Bengal Academy of Literature, the first academic association to regulate and promote Bengali language and literature was set up in Kolkata under the chairmanship of Benoy Krishna Dev in 1893. In April 1894, the academy was reorganized and rechristened as Bangiya Sahitya Parishad, and Romesh Chunder Dutt became the first president of it. Scholars like Chandranath Bose, Dwijendranath Tagore, Jagadish Chandra Bose, Prafulla Chandra Roy, Satyendranath Tagore, Haraprasad Shastri, Ramendra Sundar Trivedi later served the Parishad as presidents. Rabindranth Tagore (Vice-president: 1894–96, 1901, 1905–1909, 1917; Special Delegate: 1910) himself was closely associated to the institution since its inception.

Bangiya Sahitya Parishad is the first academic institution on matters pertaining to Bengali language. It endeavored to compile standard Bengali dictionary, grammar and terminologies, both philosophical and scientific, to collect and publish old and medieval Bengali manuscripts, and to carry out translation from other language into Bengali and research on history, philosophy and science.

Regulations of the University of Calcutta
During the 20th century, the affairs concerning the promotion of Bengali language did not remain a sole responsibility of Bangiya Sahitya Parishad. As language prospered and literature enriched, a need of linguistic reform as well as an authority to enforce the reforms was felt by the scholars of the time.

In the late 1930s, Rabindranath Tagore asked the University of Calcutta to determine the rules of Bengali spelling and Shyama Prasad Mukherjee, the then Vice-Chancellor of the university, set up a committee to look over the subject in November 1935. In May 1936, a standard rule for Bengali spelling was first imposed. These rules were later amended by Rabindranath Tagore and other scholars and practiced at academic level in all over Bengal for next 70 years.

Bangla Academy in East Bengal

After the partition of India in 1947, the people of  East Pakistan (now Bangladesh) felt a need for a new Bengali linguistic body suiting their new nationality. As a result, Bangla Academy in Dhaka was established in 1955. In 1990, the Bangla Academy enforced new regulations for Bengali spelling.

Unofficial regulators of the Bengali language in West Bengal
In West Bengal, various prominent institutions backed the process of development of the language, but that resulted in inconsistencies in it. For example, Rajsekhar Basu and Ananda Bazaar Patrika tried to simplify Bengali spelling; but instead of rationalizing the spelling system, it aroused controversy over the authority of such bodies. Even institutions like Visva-Bharati University failed in the task.

History of Paschimbanga Bangla Akademi
In 1962, the Government of West Bengal started using Bengali for all official purposes. Since then, a need for an official regulator of the language has been felt. In 1986, with the general consent of Bengali intellectuals of the time, Paschimbanga Bangla Akademi, a wing of the Information and Cultural Affairs Department of the Government of West Bengal was set up. Afterward it was converted into a society and registered under Societies Registration Act. On 8 December 1994, it was declared an autonomous Governmental body.

Members

At the time of its foundation, the Akademi had 30 members in its Karma Samiti (Working Committee) and 78 in Sadharan Parishad (General Council) including the government delegation. The chairman is called Sabhapati and Vice-Chairman is called Saha-Sabhapati. Members, officially known as Sadasyas, remain in the Akademi for life. However, any member can resign from his office by his will. In 2007, after the Nandigram massacre, some of Akademi members including Sankha Ghosh and Ashru Kumar Sikdar resigned from the Akademi. There is also a post of Secretary, or Sachib, who is the chief governmental delegation at the Akademi. The office of the Secretary of the Akademi is held by Sanat Kumar Chattopadhyay since its inception.

The members of the first Working Committee were: Annadashankar Roy (chairman), Prabodh Chandra Sen (Vice-chairman, but died after the foundation of working committee), Nanda Gopal Sengupta (Vice-chairmen), Leela Majumdar, Khudiram Das, Nepal Majumdar, Shubhendu Shekhar Mukhopadhyay, Chinmohan Sehanbish, Pabitra Sarkar, Kanak Mukhopadhyay, Krishno Dhar, Jagadish Bhattacharya, Bhabatosh Dutta, Jyotirmoy Ghosh, Sankha Ghosh, Arun Kumar Basu, Nirmalya Acharya, Ashru Kumar Shikdar, Arun Kumar Mukhopadhyay, Prabir Roy Chowdhuri, Bhudeb Chowdhuri, Somendranath Bandyopadhyay, Bijit Kumar Dutta, Pallab Sengupta, Bhakti Prasad Mallick, Prashanta Kumar Dasgupta, Nirmal Das, Santosh Chakravarty (Later Ashok Dutta) – Director of Culture, Sanat Kumar Chattopadhyay- Secretary (Government Delegate), Amitabha Mukhopadhyay- Officer-in-Charge (Government Delegate).

The members of the first General Council were: (including the members of the Working Committee) Hirendranath Dutta, Manmatha Roy, Gopal Haldar, Debipada Bhattacharya, Sushil Kumar Mukhopadhyay, Gourinath Shastri, Rama Ranjan Mukhopadhyay, Nisith Ranjan Ray, Manindranath Ghosh, Manindra Kumar Ghosh, Dr. Asit Kumar Bandyopadhyay, Rabindra Kumar DasGupta, Haraprasad Mitra, Arun Mitra, Satyajit Ray, Satyendranath Roy, Ajit Kumar Ghosh, Khsetra Gupta, Arabinda Poddar, Nirendranath Chakravarty, Golum Kuddus, Ashin Dasgupta, Khsitindra Narayan Bhattacharya, Saroj Mohan Mitra, Sukumari Bhattacharya, Subir Roy Chowdhuri, Manabendra Bandyopadhyay, Sourin Bhattacharya, Ashok Mukhopadhyay, Malini Bhattacharya, Bratindranath Mukhopadhyay, Manas Majumdar, Mohit Chattopadhyay, Narayan Chowdhuri, Samarendra Sengupta, Amitabha Dasgupta, Debesh Roy, Purnendu Patri, Shyam Sundar Dey, Amitabha Chowdhuri, Shakti Chattopadhyay, Debesh Das, Manas Roy Chowdhuri, Shibendranath Kanjilal, Sabitendranath Roy, Bibhas Bhattacharya, Dipankar Sen, Prasun Dutta, Dilip Bhattacharya – secretary, Information and Cultural Affairs Department.

Now the Akademi works under various sub-committees and editorial boards concerning different affairs. Some of these bodies are depicted below:

Akademi Banan Upo-Samiti or Akademi Spelling Sub-Committee was created to reform and rationalize Bengali orthography. This Sub-Committee includes Nirendranath Chakravarty, Sankha Ghosh, Pabitra Sarkar, Jyoti Bhushan Chaki, Nirmal Das, Ashok Mukhopadhyay, Subhash Bhattacharya, Amitabha Chowdhuri, Amitabha Mukhopadhyay, Sourin Bhattacharya, Prasun Dutta, Sanat Kumar Chattopadhyay, Arun Kumar Basu and Shubhomoy Mondal. On the recommendation of this Sub-Committee, the Akademi did its historical reforms on Bengali spelling.

Another important sub-committee is Paribhasha Upo-Samiti or Terminology Sub-Committee which is entrusted to compile standard Bengali terminology for both academic and administrative purposes. This sub-committee includes Ananda Ghosh Hazra, Alapan Bandyaopadhyay, I.A.S., Krishno Dhar, Jyoti Bhushan Chaki, Nirendranath Chakravarty, Pabitra Sarkar, Sanat Kumar Chattopadhyay, Swapan Chowdhuri and Bhabatosh Tapadar.

Editorial boards are generally founded to edit works of great authors. One of such bodies that compiled the Complete Works of Kazi Nazrul Islam, includes Annadashankar Roy (advisor), Buddhadeb Bhattacharya, ex-Chief Minister of West Bengal (advisor), Kalpataru Sengupta, Arun Kumar Basu, Pabitra Sarkar, Golum Kuddus, Krishno Dhar, Manas Majumdar, Sumita Chakravarty, Bandhan Sengupta, Manas Khanda, Biswanath Roy, Prabhat Kumar Das, Shyamal Moitra And Sanat Kumar Chattopadhyay.

Functions

The Akademi is the official authority on Bengali language in West Bengal; although its recommendations carry no legal power — but still the educational boards and the universities of West Bengal and Tripura have deep regard for its rulings.

The Akademi accomplishes all its activities in close liaison with other academic and educational institutions including universities engaged in various aspects of Bengali language, literature and culture. Apart from its own programs, it also arranges programs in cooperation with different such societies. Such activities are not confined to Kolkata only, but also in districts and sub-divisions, even in the other states.

The function of the Akademi was initially settled by a seminar held at Sisir Mancha, Kolkata from 24 February to 1 March. These seminars determined the rationale of the Akademi and proposed to make a design and blue print to achieve its goals.

The tasks entrusted on Bangla Akademi are:

The rationalization and reform of Bengali script and orthography.
Compilation of standard dictionaries, encyclopedias and grammars.
Compilation of terminologies.
Bridging the gap between Bengali and other languages through translations and other activities.
Publication of children books.
Performing research-oriented works on Bengali language, literature and culture as well as arranging scholarships for researchers.
Distribution of civil literary prizes.
Publication of publish books on different subjects
Publication of the Akademi Magazine.
Preservation of an outstanding library.
Preservation of a world-class archive and museum.
To conduct seminars and conferences and cultural festivals and fairs.

Work of Paschimbanga Bangla Akademi
Scholars at the Bangla Akademi work to promote the Bengali language in various ways. They are doing research on spelling, grammar and the origin and development of Bengali. They are publishing works by prominent writers in the language. They have built a large library to preserve original manuscripts. The government of Japan has donated Rs. 500000 for research in the academy. The government of West Bengal has also given a lump some amount of money. The Akademi is spending the money on the Indo-Japan Cultural Center in Bidhannagar. The Akademi has also developed a Bengali font designed according to the changes made by them in the Bengali script. The font is available from this link.

Festivals Conducted by Bangla Akademi
Various festivals are being conducted nowadays by Bangla Akademi, e.g., Kabita Utsab (Poetry Festival), Little Magazine Mela (Little Magazine Fair), Kathasahitya Utsab (Fiction Festival), Chhora Utsab (Rhyme Festival) etc.

Awards awarded by Bangla Akademi

Selected bibliography

Dictionaries and terminologies

Akademi Bidyarthi Abidhan (Bangla Akademi Bengali Dictionary for Students)
Akademi Banan Abidhan (Bangla Akademi Spelling Dictionary)
Paribhasha Sankalan – Prashashan (Collection of Administrative Terminologies)
Sahityer Shabdartho-Kosh (Dictionary of Literary Terms)
Bhasha-Tattwer Paribhasha (Terminology of Linguistics)
Byutpatti-Sidhyartha-Bangla Kosmh (Dictionary of Bengali Word Origin)
Bangla Bhashay Arthaniti Charcha Granthapanji (Catalogue of Economic Studies in Bengali)
Bangla Bhashay Itihaas Charcha Granthapanji (Catalogue of Historical Studies in Bengali)
Dhatubidya Paribhasha (Terminology of Metallurgy)
Saontali-Bangla Samashabda Abidhan (A Dictionary of Santali-Bengali Identical Words)

Complete and selected works of legendary authors

Sanchayita, Vol. II, (Ed. By Arun Kumar Basu) – an alternative anthology of Tagore Poems other than Sanchayita
Manik Bandyopadhyay Rachana Samagra, (Ek-Ekadash Khanda) – Complete Works of Manik Bandopadhyay, Vols. I-XI
Manik Bandyopadhyay Kishor Rachana Sambhar, (Ed. By. Parthojit Gangopadhyay) – Collected Juvenile Literature of Manik Bandopadhyay
Kazi Nazrul Islam Rachana Samagra (Ek-Saptam Khanda) – Complete Works of Kazi Nazrul Islam, Vols. I-VII
Budhhadeb Bose Prabandha Samagra (Ek-dui Khanda) – Complete Essays of Budhhadeva Basu, Vols. I-IV
Nirendranath Chakravarty Gadya Samagra (Ek-Tritiya) – Complete Prose Works of Nirendranath Chakravarty, Vols. I-III
Rezaul Karim Prabandha  Samagra – Complete Essays of Rezaul Karim
Jyoti Bhattacharya Prabandha  Samagra – Complete Essays of Jyoti Bhattacharya
Dwijendra-Giti Samagra – Complete Songs of Dwijendra Lal Roy
Somen Chanda Nirbachito Galpa Sangraha – Selected Stories of Somen Chanda
Samparka (Sampriti Bishayak Galpa) – Samparka: Stories on Communal Harmony (Ed. By Ashok Kumar Mitra and Bishnu Basu)

Collected essays

Bhasha-Bhabna: Unish-Bish Shatak – Thoughts on Language, A Collection of 37 Essays on Bengali dated from 1850 to 1950.
Prasanga Bangla Byakaran, Prothom Khanda- On Bengali Grammar, Vol. I, (20 essays on Bengali grammar from old periodicals)
Prasanga Bangla Byakaran, Dwitiyo Khanda- On Bengali Grammar, Vol. II, (Contemporary Essays on Bengali Grammar)
Saraswat  – A History of Bengali Literary Academies (Ed. By Arun Kumar Basu)
Bangalir Gaan  –  Songs of Bengal, A Golden Treasury of Bengali Music (Ed. By. Durgadas Lahiri)
Akademi Pratishtha Barshiki Bhashan Sankalan – Akademi Collection of Foundation Day Lectures
Akademi Bhashan Sankalan – Akademi Collection of Lectures
Puratan Gadyagrantha Sangraha – Collection of Old Texts (Ed. By Dr. Asit Kumar Bandyaopadhyay)
Sangbad-Samayikpatre Unish Shataker Bangali Samaj (Ek-Dui Khanda) – Nineteenth Century Bengali Society in Periodicals, Vols. I-II (Col. & Ed. By Swapan Bose)
Manaswi Annadashankar – Annadashankar Roy, A Great Thinker (Ed. By Dhiman Dasgupta)
Bangla Primer Sangraha – A Collection of Bengali Primers (Ed. By Ashish Khastogir)

Criticism 
In May 2022, the academies decision to give Bangla Akademi Literature Award to Mamata Banerjee for her poems was met with fierce criticism. Mamata Banerjee in the end gave back the prize.

See also
Bangla Academy – Bangladeshi counterpart
Paschim Banga Natya Akademi
Annadashankar Roy
Bangiya Sahitya Parishad
University of Calcutta
Rabindranath Tagore
Manipuri Sahitya Parishad

References

External links
 https://web.archive.org/web/20080708210236/http://paschimbangabanglaakademi.org/images/index.html.htm

1986 establishments in West Bengal
Scientific societies based in India
Cultural organisations based in India
Organisations based in West Bengal
Indic literature societies
Bengali language
Bengali literary institutions
Academic language institutions
Language regulators